Manambolo is a rural municipality in Analanjirofo, Madagascar.

Manambolo may also refer to:

Manambolo River, river in North-Western Madagascar

See also
 Manambolosy